Karl Leban (27 November 1908 – 28 July 1941) was an Austrian speed skater and modern pentathlete who competed in the 1936 Winter Olympics and in the 1936 Summer Olympics. At the Winter Games he finished sixth in the 500 m and twelfth in the 1500 m event. At the Summer Games he placed 26th in the modern pentathlon. Leban finished fourth allround at the 1932 European Speed Skating Championships. Domestically he won athletics titles in the 5000 m (1930 and 1934), 4×1500 m relay (1932 and 1937) and 1500 m (1937). He died during World War II when his fighter plane crashed in Ukraine.

References

External links
 
 Speed skating 1936 

1908 births
1941 deaths
Austrian male speed skaters
Austrian male modern pentathletes
Olympic speed skaters of Austria
Olympic modern pentathletes of Austria
Speed skaters at the 1936 Winter Olympics
Modern pentathletes at the 1936 Summer Olympics
Luftwaffe personnel killed in World War II
20th-century Austrian people
German World War II fighter pilots